Double R Racing is a motor racing team, which races in Formula Three and other junior levels of formula racing including the MSA Formula Championship for the 2016 season. The team was formed in November 2004 as Räikkönen Robertson Racing by then McLaren Formula One driver and  world champion with Ferrari, Kimi Räikkönen, and his race manager Steve Robertson, a former Formula Three driver. It is based in Woking, site of the McLaren manufacturing facility, and it is managed by Anthony "Boyo" Hieatt.

History

When the team was announced, it was confirmed that Räikkönen Robertson would compete in the British F3 International Series, in the Championship Class (the first of two different classes) from the 2005 season. In this first season, the two Dallara F305 Mugen-Hondas were driven by British driver Dan Clarke, and Brazilian Bruno Senna. This saw the team fare well, with Clarke taking the team's maiden win at Castle Combe, as well as five other podium finishes, and going on to finish 5th in the Championship, while Senna scored three podium finishes, and finished in 10th position in the standings.

At the BP Ultimate Masters at Zandvoort, Räikkönen Robertson only entered Senna, who qualified 18th but failed to finish, while at the Macau Grand Prix, Räikkönen Robertson again only entered one car, with Clarke appearing for Formula Three Euroseries team Prema, instead. Senna qualified 22nd around the tight, twisty Circuito da Guia, although he failed to finish in either the qualifying race or the Grand Prix itself.

For the 2006 season, Räikkönen Robertson changed their engine supplier to Mercedes HWA, upgraded to Dallara's F306 chassis, and replaced Champ Car-bound Clarke with Mike Conway, who finished 3rd in British F3 in 2005 and Stephen Jelley, to team up with Senna, as they looked to make a serious assault on the overall Series title.

The season started well, with Senna winning both races at Oulton Park. After winning the next race at Donington Park as well, the Brazilian had a useful lead at the championship. However a serious crash at Snetterton left the car unable to be raced in race 2 at the event and seemingly halted his progress. This coincided with a dramatic improvement in Conway's results and he overtook Senna in the race for the title. Conway continued on his way and his impressive results saw him take a seemingly unassailable lead, while Senna's inconsistent form saw slip behind Carlin's  Oliver Jarvis, in the race for the runner-up's spot, despite an impressive win in the wet at Mugello. At Silverstone, Conway claimed the title with another weekend to spare. In that final weekend at Thruxton, Räikkönen Robertson also ran their fourth car (the one damaged in Senna's crash at Snetterton, now rebuilt) in the Invitation Class, a category for drivers making a guest appearance. British Porsche Carrera Cup driver Danny Watts, who had been in British F3 two years before, made a return, and won the penultimate race at Thruxton. In just their second season, Räikkönen Robertson were champions, winning thirteen races from the twenty-two that took place.

In F3's international meetings, Räikkönen Robertson had far more luck than they had in 2005. At the BP Ultimate Masters, the team entered all three drivers, qualifying 7th (Senna), 12th (Conway), and 22nd (Jelley), with Senna finishing 7th, Jelley 18th, and Conway retiring. At the Macau Grand Prix, Räikkönen Robertson only entered two cars, with Senna not being able to appear. After Conway's accident in the second qualifying session, the pair ended up in 11th (Conway) and 16th (Jelley) respectively, while in the qualifying race they finished 7th (Conway) and 13th (Jelley). In the Grand Prix itself, Conway jumped from 7th to 4th at the start and as the three cars in front him collided on the first lap, he took a lead he was never to relinquish, to become the first British winner of the Grand Prix since Darren Manning in 1999, and the first winner from the British F3 International Series since Takuma Sato in 2001. Jelley, meanwhile, finished in 11th place.

For the 2007 season, Räikkönen Robertson upgraded to Dallara's latest F307 chassis, and were again powered by the Mercedes-HWA engine. Conway and Senna made the leap to the GP2 Series, whilst Jelley continued with Räikkönen Robertson, partnered by Jonathan Kennard and Finn Atte Mustonen. Meanwhile, Räikkönen Robertson also entered a team in the National Class, their two cars being driven by British driver Alistair Jackson and Spain's Albert Costa. The team claimed 4 pole positions and won 4 races, scoring 5 fastest laps.

In January 2020, the team partnered up with Argenti Motorsport for the 2020 F4 British Championship.

Success

In 2008 the team won one race with Finn Atte Mustonen. The team continued with its supply of Mercedes' engines.

In 2009 the team kept the Mercedes Supply of engine. But changed the driver line-up completely by using Daisuke Nakajima and Carlos Huertas these two spent the full season with the team and Marcus Ericsson spent 6 races with the team scoring two wins and a second place. Nakajima and Ericsson both claimed one pole position each.

In 2010 the team fielded Brazilian Driver Felipe Nasr, Daisuke Nakajima and Carlos Huertas. For the first race of the season with Nakajima scoring points in the first race of the season.

For this year's 2016 season the team is contesting both the BRDC British Formula 3 Championship and the MSA Formula Championship. Finn Aleksanteri Huovinen, Brazilian Enzo Bortoleto and his compatriot Matheus Leist are competing in F3 whilst Zane Goddard from Australia and Carrie Schreiner from Germany are competing in the MSA championship.

Matheus Leist is currently lying second in the British Formula 3 Championship, just four points behind the current leader Ricky Collard with two rounds remaining to close the gap. His teammates Huovinen and Bortoleto are also inside the top ten lying tenth and eighth respectively.

In the MSA Formula Championship, Australian Zane Goddard is currently in tenth position with 102 points but is set to rise through the rankings after a sensational weekend at Croft where he achieved his maiden victory alongside 61 points over the weekend thanks to three fastest laps and two second-place finishes in the other two rounds. German Carrie Schreiner is lying in 14th position having only contested two race weekends.

Former current series results

Euroformula Open Championship

British Formula Three Championship

Formula 3 Euro Series

‡ – Guest driver – ineligible for points.

FIA Formula 3 European Championships

‡ – Guest driver – ineligible for points.

F4 Spanish Championship

BRDC British Formula 3 Championship

F4 British Championship

Timeline

Notes

References

External links
Team Profile Official British F3 website

British auto racing teams
2004 establishments in the United Kingdom
Auto racing teams established in 2004
Formula BMW teams
Formula 3 Euro Series teams
British Formula Three teams
FIA Formula 3 European Championship teams
Euroformula Open Championship teams